Arima Central Secondary School formerly called Arima Government Secondary School (commonly referred to as "Central" or "ACSS") is a co-educational secondary school on Roberts Street in Arima in the Republic of Trinidad and Tobago. 
The school is administered by the Ministry of Education: Trinidad and Tobago.

Arima Central Secondary school is regarded as one of the best schools in east Trinidad. The winner of the Environmental Management Authority Green Leaf award in 2006, students have had marked success in the areas of Science, Politics, Law, Engineering, English literature, Business, as well as Performing Arts.

The school can be termed a "seven year" school since it is offers form six subjects. Expanding its list of subjects, it is now one of only two schools in Arima offering Mathematics as a Form Six subject. In 2009, the school introduced Chemistry and Biology to Form Six students, and the school introduced Physics in 2011. The introduction of form six classes saw and increase in students pursuing higher learning, more than 90% of these students have gone onto tertiary education at the University of the West Indies as well as other prestigious schools in the US, Europe, and Canada. 

The motto of the school is "Adelantemos Juntos" which translates to "Moving Forward Together" in English.

School layout 

The main entrance to ACSS happens to be via Robert Street, which feeds directly into the front gate. Upon entering the front gate the Form 2 and 3 blocks are immediately on the left, the cafeteria is directly ahead and the administrative offices are to the right along with the Information Technology lab. Beyond the cafeteria is the basketball court, to the right is a famous spot for students fondly called "the tunnel", to the left is the staff room. Walking straight ahead would lead to an open area for sports. The form six block is the last one closest to Arima New Government, a primary school which was formerly situated next to ACSS.

Subjects offered at Form Six Level 
This information is correct as of June 2015.

Technical Studies
 Geometrical and Mechanical Drawing

Business Studies
 Accounting
 Economics
 Management of Business (Business Studies or M.O.B)
 Entrepreneurship

Modern Studies
 Literatures in English
 Spanish
 History

Science Studies
 Environmental Science
 Pure Mathematics
 Geography
 Chemistry
 Biology
 Physics
 Physical Education

Compulsory Subjects
 Caribbean Studies
 Communication Studies

Active groups and extracurricular activities

Co-Curricular 
 Netball
 Cadets
 Football
 Basketball
 Cricket
 Swimming
 Badminton
 Volleyball
 Track & Field
 Ballroom and Latin Dance
 Scrabble
 Chess
 Table Tennis

Other Extra Curricular Groups 

 Various Religious Groups
 Heroes Foundation

Academic Year 
The school year is divided into three terms, with Term 1 beginning in early September and running to December, Term 2 running from January to March, and Term 3 from April to July. In addition to a summer break, there is typically a two-week break between terms.

School holidays/vacation

First Term: September to December
 Republic Day, September 24
 Eid ul-Fitr
 Diwali
 Christmas, Approximately 3 weeks vacation

Second Term: January to March
 Carnival
 Easter, Approximately 2 weeks vacation
 Spiritual Baptist/Shouter Liberation Day, March 30

Third Term: April to July
 Corpus Christi
 Indian Arrival Day, May 30
 Labour Day, July 19
 Summer, Approximately 9 weeks vacation

View of the school

External links
 Ministry of Education: Trinidad and Tobago

Schools in Trinidad and Tobago
Educational institutions established in 1960
1960 establishments in Trinidad and Tobago